Harry Ernst Wierwille (March 19, 1907 – October 1977) was the original secretary-treasurer of The Way International, as well as the brother of Victor Paul Wierwille. He was affectionately known as Uncle Harry to Way followers.

Harry Wierwille owned a furniture store and was quite successful in his business. He was known for his generosity and humor. According to Uncle Harry, a book published by American Christian Press, the publishing arm of The Way International, he would empty his checkbook every year except for $1, giving all of the money to The Way. Despite this, he said he never lacked for any material possessions.

References

1907 births
1977 deaths
American businesspeople in retailing
The Way International